Purav Raja and Divij Sharan were the defending champions and successfully defended their title, defeating Sanchai Ratiwatana and Michael Venus in the final, 5–7, 7–6(7–3), [10–4].

Seeds

Draw

Draw

References
 Main Draw

All Japan Indoor Tennis Championships - Doubles
2014 Doubles